The Packard Pacific is an automobile manufactured by the Packard Motor Car Company of Detroit, Michigan for the 1954 model year. It replaced the Mayfair and was sold exclusively as a two-door hardtop.

In the early 1950s, Packard used a numeric naming scheme that designated Packard's least expensive models as the Packard 200 and 200 Deluxe, while two-door hardtops and convertibles were designated Packard 250 and its mid-range sedan the Packard 300. For model years 1951 through 1953, the 250 hardtop was named the Mayfair; for model year 1954 only, the hardtop was given the model name Pacific.

The Mayfair, Packard's first hardtop offering, was created for the 1951 model year in order to keep in competition with Cadillac, Buick, and Imperial from Chrysler, whose hardtop sales were booming. The Mayfair was named after the exclusive Mayfair district of London.  In renaming it as the Pacific, Packard associated the model with its personal luxury car offering, the Caribbean.  Both the Mayfair and Pacific shared the same straight-eight engines (a 327-cubic inch for the Mayfair and a 359-cubic inch for the Pacific) with top-of-the-line, or "senior" Packards, but were mounted on the  wheelbase of less expensive, or "junior" models. The Pacific came standard-equipped with Packard's Ultramatic automatic transmission.

The Pacific and Mayfair were distinguished by high levels of interior trim: for instance, leather upholstery was provided, and the cars' interior headliners were ornamented with chrome strips intended to suggest a convertible top. The cars were also given innovative exterior color schemes; most were given two-tone paint jobs (for example: "Carnation" (white) and "Amethyst" (lavender)), which were considered fashionable at the time.

1,189 Pacific hardtops were built before production concluded for the 1954 model year. Starting in 1955, Packard renamed its senior hardtop the Four Hundred.

References 

Pacific
Coupés
Cars introduced in 1954